The Journal of Construction Engineering and Management is a monthly peer-reviewed scientific journal published by the American Society of Civil Engineers covering construction material handling, equipment, production planning, scheduling, estimating, labor productivity, contract administration, and construction management.

Abstracting and indexing
The journal is abstracted and indexed in Ei Compendex, ProQuest databases, Civil Engineering Database, Inspec, Scopus, and EBSCO databases.

References

External links

Civil engineering journals
American Society of Civil Engineers academic journals
Publications established in 1956
English-language journals
Monthly journals